Alfred Julius Mõttus (12 September 1886 – 4 October 1942 Sosva, Sverdlovsk Oblast, Russia) was an Estonian politician.

From 1927 to 1928 he was Minister of Education.

References

1886 births
1942 deaths
Members of the Riiginõukogu
Members of the Estonian National Assembly
Members of the Riigikogu, 1926–1929
Members of the Riigikogu, 1929–1932
Education and Social affairs ministers of Estonia
Recipients of the Order of the White Star, 2nd Class
Estonian people who died in Soviet detention
People who died in the Gulag
University of Tartu alumni
People from Valga Parish